The 2016–17 Palestine Cup is the 2016–17 season of the top football cup in Palestine.

There are two competitions, the Gaza Strip Cup for clubs in the Gaza Strip, and the West Bank Cup for clubs in the West Bank. A two-legged Palestine Cup final is played between the cup winners of the Gaza Strip and the West Bank.

Gaza Strip Cup

Preliminary round 1

|-
!colspan=3|16 Dec 2016

|-
!colspan=3|17 Dec 2016

|-
!colspan=3|18 Dec 2016

|}

Preliminary round 2

|-
!colspan=3|23 Dec 2016

|-
!colspan=3|24 Dec 2016

|-
!colspan=3|25 Dec 2016

|}

Round of 32

|-
!colspan=3|14 Apr 2017

|-
!colspan=3|15 Apr 2017

|-
!colspan=3|16 Apr 2017

|}

Round of 16

|-
!colspan=3|21 Apr 2017

|-
!colspan=3|22 Apr 2017

|-
!colspan=3|23 Apr 2017

|}

Quarter-finals

|-
!colspan=3|28 Apr 2017

|-
!colspan=3|29 Apr 2017

|}

Semi-finals

|-
!colspan=3|5 May 2017

|-
!colspan=3|6 May 2017

|}

Final

|-
!colspan=3|12 May 2017

|}

West Bank Cup

Preliminary round 1

|-
!colspan=3|13 Dec 2016

|-
!colspan=3|16 Dec 2016

|-
!colspan=3|18 Dec 2016

|-
!colspan=3|19 Dec 2016

|-
!colspan=3|20 Dec 2016

|}

Preliminary round 2

|-
!colspan=3|20 Dec 2016

|-
!colspan=3|21 Dec 2016

|-
!colspan=3|23 Dec 2016

|-
!colspan=3|28 Dec 2016

|-
!colspan=3|31 Dec 2016

|-
!colspan=3|6 Jan 2017

|}

Round of 32

|-
!colspan=3|16 Feb 2017

|-
!colspan=3|17 Feb 2017

|-
!colspan=3|18 Feb 2017

|-
!colspan=3|19 Feb 2017

|}

Round of 16

|-
!colspan=3|24 Mar 2017

|-
!colspan=3|25 Mar 2017

|-
!colspan=3|11 Apr 2017

|-
!colspan=3|12 Apr 2017

|}

Quarter-finals

|-
!colspan=3|28 May 2017

|-
!colspan=3|29 May 2017

|}

Semi-finals

|-
!colspan=3|31 May 2017

|-
!colspan=3|1 Jun 2017

|}

Final

|-
!colspan=3|17 Jun 2017

|}

Palestine Cup Final

See also
2016–17 West Bank Premier League
2016–17 Gaza Strip Premier League

References

Palestine Cup
Palestine
Cup